The Dark Masquerade is a collaborative remix EP by vocalist, Destini Beard and Midnight Syndicate. The EP blends Destini's original lyrics and vocals with previously released songs from Midnight Syndicate's albums. A previously unreleased gothic rock remix of Troubled Times was used in the title track, Dark Masquerade.

Background and production 
In an interview with Black Gate Magazine, Midnight Syndicate composer, Edward Douglas, said The Dark Masquerade came about when Destini Beard sent the band a recording of her singing lyrics over top of one of their songs. The idea to include that song on the movie soundtrack to The Dead Matter (2010) and release an EP, came shortly thereafter. Working remotely throughout production, Destini would record tracks at Green Valley Recording and then send them to Douglas and Goszka for mixing and mastering. The remixes on the EP used titles that were different from the original recordings in order to reflect the added lyrics.

Reception 
The success of the EP led to a subsequent full-length collaborative remix album entitled, A Time Forgotten, which was released in August 2012.

Track listing

Personnel 
Destini Beard – vocals, vocal arrangements, lyrics
Edward Douglas – composer
Gavin Goszka – composer

Production 
Producers – Edward Douglas, Gavin Goszka
Mixing – Edward Douglas, Gavin Goszka
Mastering – Gavin Goszka
Cover art – Ed Beard Jr.
Layout – Alec Keating
Engineering – Green Valley Recording

References

2010 EPs
Midnight Syndicate albums
Destini Beard EPs